Passages Malibu Addiction Treatment Center, known as Passages Malibu, is a for-profit addiction treatment facility located in Malibu, California and founded by Pax and Chris Prentiss in 2001. Passages Ventura opened in 2009 in Port Hueneme, California.

History and founders

The center was founded by a father and son, Chris and Pax Prentiss.  Chris Prentiss is a former real estate developer with no formal training in rehabilitation or medicine.

Passages operates on the principle that people become addicted to drugs and alcohol due to underlying and unresolved problems in their lives. Passages relies on one-to-one therapy sessions.

The center comprises a $15 million mansion on  overlooking the Pacific Ocean. The center provides a number of recreational opportunities, including tennis and swimming. Unlike many other centers, clients are allowed to use their cell phones and have computer access.

A second, less expensive facility called Passages Ventura opened in 2009 in Port Hueneme, California.

In 2012, the center had 29 beds and approximately 25 percent of its clients were Californians.

Controversy

Passages, and the treatment method it employs, have been the subject of controversy. According to a September 2013 New York Times report, it is "the largest and most expensive" of the many rehab facilities in Malibu.  In 2011, treatment at the center cost $88,500 a month. In contrast, the Betty Ford Center cost $27,400 for 30 days in 2011. Passages keeps any money that has been deposited, even if a patient exits the center before completing treatment similar to other addiction treatment facilities.

In addition, Passages' treatment philosophy is controversial both because it disputes the efficacy of multi-step treatment programs and also because the founders do not believe that addiction is a disease. Passages claims that its method produces above an 80-percent rehabilitation rate. However, the accuracy of these statistics has been questioned by other rehabilitation professionals, particularly because they include people who have been out of treatment for only 30 days.

References

External links
Official Website

Drug and alcohol rehabilitation centers
Addiction organizations in the United States
Mental health organizations in California